The 1981 Swedish motorcycle Grand Prix was the thirteenth round of the 1981 Grand Prix motorcycle racing season. It took place on the weekend of 14–16 August 1981 at the Scandinavian Raceway in Anderstorp, Sweden.

Classification

500 cc

References

Swedish motorcycle Grand Prix
Swedish
Motorcycle Grand Prix